Westover Air Reserve Base  is an Air Force Reserve Command (AFRC) installation located in the Massachusetts communities of Chicopee and Ludlow, near the city of Springfield, Massachusetts. Established at the outset of World War II, today Westover is the largest Air Force Reserve base in the United States, home to approximately 5,500 military and civilian personnel, and covering 2500 acres (10 km²). Until 2011, it was a backup landing site for the NASA Space Shuttle and in the past few years has expanded to include a growing civilian access airport (Westover Metropolitan Airport) sharing Westover's military-maintained runways. The installation was named for Major General Oscar Westover who was commanding officer of the Army Air Corps in the 1930s.

The host unit is the 439th Airlift Wing (439 AW) of the Fourth Air Force (4 AF), Air Force Reserve Command. Outside of the AFRC command structure, the 439 AW and Westover are operationally gained by the Air Mobility Command (AMC).

Due to its location as one of the few remaining active military air bases in the northeast United States, Westover ARB is transitted by many different U.S. military aircraft of all the services.

Westover ARB has the longest runway in Massachusetts.

Units 
439th Airlift Wing:
 439th Operations Group
 337th Airlift Squadron
 439th Aerospace Medicine Squadron
 439th Aeromedical Staging Squadron
 439th Operations Support Squadron
 439th Airlift Control Flight
 439th Maintenance Group
 439th Maintenance Squadron
 439th Aircraft Maintenance Squadron
 439th Mission Support Group
 439th Force Support Squadron
 439th Communications Squadron
 439th Logistics Readiness Squadron
 439th Civil Engineering Squadron
 439th Security Forces Squadron
 58th Aerial Port Squadron
 42nd Aerial Port Squadron

Civil Air Patrol:
Westover Composite Squadron, NER-MA-015, Massachusetts Civil Air Patrol

U.S. Army Reserve:
302nd Maneuver Enhancement Brigade
304th Transportation Company (Cargo)
655th Regional Support Group
382nd Military Police Battalion (CS)
287th Medical Detachment, 804th Medical Brigade
226th Transportation Company (Railway Operating)(assigned to the 757th Transportation Battalion (Railway), Milwaukee, WI; battalion and all subordinate units inactivated by September 2015)

Navy:
Naval Mobile Construction Battalion 27

Marine Corps:
Marine Wing Support Squadron 472, Detachment B
Marine Air Support Squadron 6

Military Entry Processing Command (DOD):
Springfield Military Entrance Processing Station (MEPS)

History
The field was constructed in anticipation of World War II.

In 1951, Air Defense Command arrived, but then turned over the base in 1955 to Strategic Air Command, which sent the 4050th, later 499th Air Refueling Wing, to operate from the base. The 99th Bombardment Wing arrived in 1956. In case of nuclear war, an alternate SAC command bunker, called The Notch, was constructed deep within nearby Bare Mountain.

From 1954 to 1962 the Stony Brook Air Force Station in Ludlow was a nuclear weapons Operational Storage Site for Air Materiel Command (AMC-OSS), one of five in the U.S. During this period Stony Brook was the home of the 3084th Aviation Depot Group, part of the 3079th Aviation Depot Wing. In 1962 Stony Brook was transferred to SAC with the 24th Munitions Maintenance Squadron replacing the 3084th, and stored and maintained nuclear weapons for SAC aircraft at Westover until deactivation in 1973. Today, the Stony Brook site is the home of the Massachusetts Municipal Wholesale Electric Company (MMWEC), Hampden County Jail, and other local businesses.

On January 7, 1971, after taking off from Westover Air Force Base a Boeing B-52C Stratofortress (serial 54-26660) of Strategic Air Command crashed into northern Lake Michigan at the mouth of Little Traverse Bay near Charlevoix, Michigan, while on a low-level training flight. All nine crew members aboard were lost. No remains of the crewmen were recovered.

Air Force Reserve

The 2005 Base Realignment and Closure Commission ruled that Westover would absorb other military units in New England. The expansion proposed the transfer of all military operations at Bradley International Airport to Westover and the nearby Barnes Municipal Airport. The exception to this decision is the 103rd Airlift Wing, which remained at Bradley. A $32 million building project accommodated the additional 1600 service members required by the plan.

The new Armed Forces Reserve Center hosts Army, Air Force, Marine Corps, and Navy Reserve operations. The Massachusetts Army National Guard also made its debut at the base.

The base celebrated its 75th anniversary with an air show on 16–17 May 2015, where the Blue Angels headlined the 2015 Great New England Air Show. During this time, it was announced that the Westover was in the running for a squadron of the new KC-46A Pegasus. Later that year, it was announced that the base would not be receiving the plane, which instead was given to the 916th Air Refueling Wing at Seymour Johnson Air Force Base. Westover was also in competition with Tinker Air Force Base and Grissom Air Reserve Base for the plane.

The local government credits Westover with spurring development of the Memorial Drive corridor, including several planned hotels and a retail plaza.

Facilities and aircraft 
A new Air Traffic Control tower was constructed in 2002 and the old tower was demolished. As a center for military air operations, Westover Air Reserve Base poses several hazards to local residents. These include air pollution, noise pollution, and water contamination hazards – all of which are shared with similar-sized commercial airports. Westover's extended operations history has produced numerous hazardous waste sites.

According to Federal Aviation Administration records for the 12-month period ending 31 October 2017, the airport had 16,213 aircraft operations, an average of 44 per day: 64% military, 33% general aviation and 3% air carrier. There were 40 aircraft at the time based at this airport: 16 military, 11 single engine, 5 multi-engine, 5 jet aircraft, 2 gliders and 1 helicopter.

Military facilities are under control of Col. Joseph D. Janik, Commander, 439th Airlift Wing. The civilian portion of the airport is run by Michael Bolton, Director of Civil Aviation (an employee of the Westover Metropolitan Corporation).

Previous names

 Northeast Air Base, c. 1 August 1939
 Westover Field, 1 December 1939
 Westover Air Force Base, 13 January 1948

 Westover Air Reserve Base, 1991
 Westover Joint Air Reserve Base, 2003
 Westover Air Reserve Base, 2003

Major commands to which assigned

 Northeast Air District, Nov 1940
 Re-designated First Air Force, 9 April 1941
 Air Transport Command, 1 February 1946
 Military Air Transport Service, 1 June 1948

 Strategic Air Command, 1 April 1955
 Air Force Reserve, 1 May 1974 – present

Major units assigned

 10th Signal Platoon, 6 June 1940 – 30 June 1940
 Third Signal Service Co, 30 June 1940 – 22 July 1940
 Detachment Base HQ and 26th Air Base Squadron, 22 July 1940 – 1 December 1940
 25th Base HQ and Air Base Squadron, 1 December 1940 – 1 October 1941
 1st Air Force Service Command 1 October 1941 – 5 January 1942
 34th Bombardment Group, 29 May 1941 – 22 January 1942
 60th Transport Group, 21 May 1941 – 20 May 1942
 13th Bombardment Group, 22 January 1942 – 30 November 1942
 64th Troop Carrier Group, 6 June 1942 – 20 July 1942
 301st Bombardment Group, 30 June 1942 – 3 August 1942
 326th Fighter Group, 1 November 1942 – 12 October 1943
 402d Fighter Group, 1 October 1943 – 12 October 1943
 459th Bombardment Group, 29 October 1943 – 3 January 1944
 471st Bombardment Group, 28 January 1944 – 10 April 1944
 386th Bombardment Group, 30 September 1945 – 7 November 1945
 409th Bombardment Group, 6 October 1945 – 7 November 1945
 341st Bombardment Group, 6 October 1945 – 7 November 1945
 Army Air Forces (later Air Force) Separation Port, 14 October 1946 – 1 November 1949
 1st Air Transport Group (Provisional), 15 March 1947 – 1 June 1948
 2d Air Transport Wing (Provisional), 23 April 1947 – 2 June 1948
 Atlantic Division, Air Transport Command, 1 November 1947 – 1 June 1948
 520th Air Transport Wing, 1 June 1948
 Redesignated 1600th Air Transport Wing, 1 October 1948 – 1 April 1955
 Atlantic Division, Military Air Transport Service, 1 June 1948 – 31 May 1955
 143d Airways & Air Communications Service Squadron, 1 June 1948
 Redesignated 1917th Airways & Air Communications Squadron, 1 October 1948
 Redesignated 1917th Communications Squadron, 1 July 1961 – 1984
 8501st Air Transport Group, 27 June 1949 – 19 July 1951
 Squadron VR-6 (US Navy), 3 August 1949 - c. 10 June 1955
 60th Fighter-Interceptor Squadron, 1 January 1951 – 18 August 1955
 3084th Aviation Depot Squadron (Later:) Group,
 Stoneybrook AFS [adjacent to Westover AFB] till 17 March 1954 – 1 November 1954

 26th Air Refueling Squadron, 22 April 1955 – 7 August 1957
 324th Fighter-Interceptor Squadron, 18 October 1955 – 25 June 1958
 337th Fighter-Interceptor Squadron, 18 October 1955 – 25 June 1958
 384th Air Refueling Squadron, 1 April 1955 – 25 June 1966
 4050th Air Refueling Wing, 1 April 1955 – 1 January 1963
 Eighth Air Force, 13 June 1955 – 1 April 1970
 8th Reconnaissance Technical Squadron, 1 May 1955 – 31 March 1970
 18th Communications Squadron (Air Force), 8 May 1955 – 30 November 1973
 57th Air Division, 4 September 1956 – 2 July 1969
 99th Bombardment Wing, 4 September 1956 – 31 March 1974
 24th Aviation Depot Squadron, 1 January 1957
 Redesignated 24th Munitions Maintenance Squadron, 1 January 1960 – 30 September 1972
 99th Munitions Maintenance Squadron, 30 September 1972 – 31 March 1974
 99th Air Refueling Squadron, 22 August 1957 – 30 September 1973
 4729th Air Defense Group, 8 July 1957 – 25 June 1958
 North Atlantic Communications Region, 2 June 1958 – 1 July 1963
 Air Force Satellite Photo Processing Laboratory
 Redesignated 6594th Test Squadron, 26 January 1961 – 10 November 1965
 76th Fighter-Interceptor Squadron, 1 February 1961 – 1 July 1963
 499th Air Refueling Wing, 15 November 1962 – 25 June 1966
 337th Military Airlift Squadron, 1 April 1966
 Redesignated: 337th Tactical Airlift Squadron, 1972
 Redesignated: 337th Military Airlift Squadron, 1 October 1987
 Redesignated: 337th Airlift Squadron, 1 February 1992 – present
 905th Military Airlift Group, 1 April 1966
 Redesignated: 905th Tactical Airlift Group, 1972-1 April 1974
 4713th Defense Systems Evaluation Squadron, 15 September 1972 – 15 April 1974
 901st Tactical Airlift Group, 17 September 1973 – 1 April 1974
 439th Tactical Airlift Wing, 14 March 1974
 Redesignated: 439th Military Airlift Wing, 1 October 1987
 Redesignated: 439th Airlift Wing, 1 February 1992 – present

See also 

 Massachusetts World War II Army Airfields
 Eastern Air Defense Force (Air Defense Command)
 List of military installations in Massachusetts

References

 
 
 Maurer, Maurer. Air Force Combat Units of World War II. Washington, D.C.: U.S. Government Printing Office 1961 (republished 1983, Office of Air Force History).
 Ravenstein, Charles A. Air Force Combat Wings Lineage and Honors Histories 1947–1977. Maxwell Air Force Base, Alabama: Office of Air Force History 1984. .
 Mueller, Robert. Air Force Bases Volume I: Active Air Force Bases Within the United States of America on 17 September 1982. Office of Air Force History, 1989.

External links

 

 Cowboy 57 (1959) James Steward documentary short on B-52 Crew. Documentary features Westover Air Force Base. https://www.youtube.com/watch?v=DPnW5GIB0JU 

Installations of the United States Air Force in Massachusetts
Initial United States Air Force installations
Installations of Strategic Air Command
Buildings and structures in Chicopee, Massachusetts
Airports in Hampden County, Massachusetts
1939 establishments in Massachusetts
Military installations established in 1939